Lake Marion High School & Technology Center (LMHS) is a four-year public high school in Santee, South Carolina. It is the one of the many high schools in Orangeburg County School District. It serves as the opening for two middle schools, Elloree Elementary-Middle School and Holly Hill Roberts Middle School.

References

Public high schools in South Carolina
Schools in Orangeburg County, South Carolina
International Baccalaureate schools in South Carolina
Magnet schools in South Carolina